USS Zuiderdijk (Id. No. 2724) was a cargo ship that served in the United States Navy from 1918 to 1919.

Pre-World War I commercial service and seizure for U.S. Navy
Zuiderdijk was built as the freighter SS Sharistan in 1912 by William Gray & Company Ltd. at West Hartlepool, England, in the United Kingdom. She was launched on 17 June 1912.

Later renamed SS Zuiderdijk, she was in commercial operation with the Holland-America Line in 1918, when the pressing need of the United States for ships to transport men and material to the front in Europe during World War I forced President Woodrow Wilson to order the seizure of Dutch ships in American ports under international law's right of angary. Customs officials at San Juan, Puerto Rico, took possession of her on 21 March 1918 and turned her over to the U.S. Navy, which placed her in commission as USS Zuiderdijk (Id. No. 2724) on 23 March 1918.

World War I service
After preliminary refitting and arming, Zuiderdijk departed San Juan on 29 March 1918 and shaped a course for the Panama Canal Zone. She remained at Cristobal, Panama, for nearly a month before getting underway on 25 April 1918 and steaming north. The ship entered New York Harbor on 4 May 1918, unloaded the Panama Railroad Company cargo she had picked up at Cristobal, and replaced it with United States Army supplies destined for Europe.

Zuiderdijk departed the United States East Coast in convoy on 17 May 1918 and entered Le Havre, France, on 1 June 1918. After discharging her cargo and taking on ballast, Zuiderdijk stood out of Le Havre on 12 June 1918 and headed for the United States. She concluded a 20-day crossing of the Atlantic Ocean when she moored in New York, New York, again on 2 July 1918.

Eleven days of repairs and cargo loading preceded the ship's second departure for France on 13 July 1918. Arriving at Gironde, France, on 28 July 1918, Zuiderdijk pulled into St. Nazaire, France, on 29 July 1918. She remained there until mid-August, trading the incoming cargo for one bound for New York. The cargo ship left St. Nazaire on 18 August 1918 and returned to New York on 31 August 1918.

During the ensuing two weeks, Zuiderdijk went into drydock for repairs, took on fuel, and loaded cargo for France. On 14 September 1918, the ship stood out of New York on her third and final wartime voyage to Europe. Arriving at Brest, France, on 29 September 1918, she moved to Le Verdon-sur-Mer, France, on 30 September 1918 and began discharging her cargo. Upon completion of that operation, Zuiderdijk loaded ballast and departed for the United States on 15 October 1918.

Post-World War I service
Zuiderdijk arrived in New York on 28 October 1918. While she was there preparing for the return crossing, the armistice of 11 November 1918 ended hostilities. On 12 November 1918, she departed New York on the first of two postwar voyages to Europe. The ship reached Quiberon, France, on 25 November 1918, unloaded her burden, and replaced it with a mixed load of 700 tons of rails for ballast and 500 tons of general cargo for return to the United States. She departed the French coast on 6 December 1918 and entered New York harbor on 24 December 1918.

After minor repairs, Zuiderdijk moved south to Norfolk, Virginia, where she loaded a cargo belonging to the United States Shipping Board. Late in January 1919, she transported that cargo via the Panama Canal to Guayaquil, Ecuador, loaded a cargo of cocoa and, on 12 February 1919, headed for the Panama Canal once again. On 10 March 1919, the ship arrived at St. Thomas in the United States Virgin Islands, where she received orders to continue immediately on to France. Zuiderdijk entered Le Havre, France, on 27 March 1919 and remained there almost a month before heading back to the United States on 24 April 1919.

Arriving in New York on 7 May 1919, Zuiderdijk began loading a United States Shipping Board cargo for her last voyage as a ship of the United States Navy. She stood out of New York on 17 June 1919, discharged her cargo at London, England, during the first two weeks of July 1919, and continued on to Rotterdam in the Netherlands. She reached Rotterdam on 17 July 1919. There, on 21 July 1919, Zuiderdijk simultaneously was decommissioned, struck from the Navy List, and returned to her former owners.

Return to mercantile service
Zuiderdijk resumed mercantile service, first under the Dutch flag with the Holland-America Line and, after 1923, with T. Law and Company as Misty Law. Subsequently Edera, Frin and Mahfuz, she was broken up in 1957.

References

External links
Naval Historical Center Online Library of Selected Images: Civilian Ships: Steamship Zuiderdijk (Dutch Freighter, 1912), Previously named Sharistan, Served as USS Zuiderdijk (ID # 2724) in 1918-1919

World War I cargo ships of the United States
Ships built on the River Tees
1912 ships
Cargo ships of the United States Navy